Cheshire Cat is the fourth studio album by American organist Ronnie Foster recorded in 1975 and released on the Blue Note label.

Reception
The Allmusic review by Jason Ankeny awarded the album 4 stars and stated "Few records that fall into the soul-jazz genre balance both sides of the equation so carefully or so deftly".

Track listing
All compositions by Ronnie Foster except as indicated
 "Like a Child" - 4:57   
 "Tuesday Heartbreak" (Stevie Wonder) - 4:47 
 "Fly Away" - 6:18    
 "Funky Motion" - 8:13  
 "Heartless" - 8:10  
 "Cheshire Cat" - 3:45

Recorded at A&R Studios in New York City on March 21 (tracks 1 & 4), March 24, 1975 (tracks 5 & 6), March 25, 1975 (track 2), and March 27 (track 3), 1975.

Personnel
Ronnie Foster - organ, keyboards, vocals 
Joe Beck - guitar
George Benson - guitar, backing vocals
William Allen - bass
Gary King - electric bass
Dennis Davis - drums
Mtume - conga, percussion

References 

Blue Note Records albums
Ronnie Foster albums
1975 albums